{{DISPLAYTITLE:Theta1 Orionis B}}

Theta1 Orionis B (θ1 Orionis B), also known as BM Orionis, is a multiple star system containing at least five members. It is also one of the main stars of the Trapezium Cluster, with the others being A, C, and D.  The primary is an eclipsing variable and one of the youngest known eclipsing binary systems.

Variability

θ1 Orionis B varies in brightness and has been given the variable star designation BM Orionis.  Every 6.47 days, it drops from magnitude 7.90 to a minimum of magnitude 8.65 for 8–9 hours.  It was quickly classified as an eclipsing variable showing total eclipses of the brighter component, an Algol-type variable.  In between the primary eclipses, there are slight brightness variations attributed to reflection effects, and a shallow secondary eclipse of less than a tenth of a magnitude.

Although the light curve appears straightforward, it shows variations in the shape of the eclipse from cycle to cycle and the properties of the eclipsing component cannot easily be reconciled with the light curve.

Mini-cluster
θ1 Orionis B has been resolved into four stars.  Conventionally, the brightest star is known as B1, while the companions are known as B2, B3, and B4.  B2 and B3 are only just over 0.1" apart, and the two are 0.9" from B1.  B2 is approximately two magnitudes fainter than B1, and B3 another magnitude fainter.  In between, B4 is 0.6" from B1 and five magnitudes fainter.

The brightest component, B1, is known to be an eclipsing binary and its unresolved companion is generally called B5.  A third component of the eclipsing system has been proposed to account for unusual variations in the timing of the eclipses, but is not yet widely accepted.  The unseen companion is likely to be a pre-main-sequence star with an age of between 10,000 and 100,000 years, making it one of the least-evolved stars known.  As of 2013, the pair were considered to be the youngest known eclipsing binary.

The stars making up θ1 Orionis B are gravitationally bound, but their configuration is likely to be unstable and will eventually decay.  Only the close B1/B5 binary will remain after a few million years.

Properties
θ1 Orionis B1 is a hot main sequence star with a spectral type of B1.  Its spectroscopic companion B5 is estimated to have a spectral type of G2 III from observations during the total eclipses.  The unusual and changeable eclipses are thought to be caused by a translucent disc surrounding the secondary star.  It is seen nearly edge-on and variations in its opacity cause differences in the light curve shape.

References

Orion (constellation)
B-type main-sequence stars
Algol variables
5
Orionis, BM
037021
J05351611-0523068
Orionis, Theta1B
Orionis, 41, B
1894